Debug Project is an ongoing project by Alphabet Inc. subsidiary Verily in California to reduce the numbers of mosquitoes in a given area through interruption of the reproductive cycle.  Through laboratory methods naturally-occurring bacteria Wolbachia infect healthy male mosquitoes of the species Aedes aegypti. Subsequently these mosquitoes are released into the wild with the intent to mate with female mosquitoes and by virtue of the Wolbachia infection lay non-producing eggs.  It is believed that through this process the overall population of mosquitoes will be reduced by interrupting the reproductive cycle.  The hope is that if successful, these might be released in more endemic areas of the world where mosquitoes pose a health risk through the diseases they carry.

References

Alphabet Inc.
Malaria